Viru Square was a square in the center of Tallinn, Estonia. It existed as a square until 2002 when the construction of Viru Centre began. Currently only a roundabout and an official "street name" are left of the former open area. Also, all of the four tram lines of Tallinn go through the roundabout.

Names over time
 Until 1939: Russian market. Also known as lice market
 1939–1940: Viru Square
 1940–1960: Stalin Square (during the German occupation [1941–1944] ).
 1960–1970: Centre Square
 1970–present: renamed Viru Square

Buildings around Viru Square
 Viru hotel (1972), Viru Square 4
 Café Amigo
 Viru Centre, Viru  4/6
Viru Centre Bus Terminal, Viru  6
 Fire Station, Vana-Viru Street 14 
 Tammsaare Park - named after Estonian writer A. H. Tammsaare

References

External links
 Linda Järve. Viru väljak neelab 1,7 miljardit krooni. Õhtuleht, 23. April 1999
 Võim ja väljak. Arhitektuuriajaloolane Karin Hallas kirjutab võimusuhete klaarimisest Tallinna väljakutel. Eesti Ekspress Online: Areen, 23. märts 2000
 Jüri Muttika. Tallinna kaks südant. Eesti Ekspress, 04. mai 2006

Squares in Tallinn